= Dong Dajie =

Dong Dajie (东大街), meaning "Eastern Avenue" in Chinese, is the name of several main roads and markets in China.

- Dong Dajie, a notable thoroughfare and market in Xi'an, Shaanxi
- Dong Dajie, a main thoroughfare in Dunhuang, Gansu, home of the Dunhuang Night Market
